Calzada (possibly from Aymara , stones; or Spanish , road) is a mountain in the Andes, about 5,874 m (19,272 ft) high, located in the Cordillera Real of Bolivia. It lies in the La Paz Department, Larecaja Province, on the border of the Sorata Municipality and the Guanay Municipality. It is situated south-east of Ancohuma, between the mountain Q'asiri in the north-west and Chearoco in the south-east, and east of San Francisco Lake.

See also
Chachacomani
 Illampu
 List of mountains in the Andes

References 

Mountains of La Paz Department (Bolivia)
Glaciers of Bolivia